Halil Kut (1881 – 20 August 1957) was an Ottoman Turkish military commander and politician. He served in the Ottoman army during World War I, notably taking part in the military campaigns against Russia in the Caucasus and the British in Mesopotamia.
His greatest achievement was surrounding the British expeditionary force in Kut, for 163 days until they surrendered.

Halil was responsible for numerous atrocities committed against Armenian and Assyrian civilians during the war, overseeing the massacres of Armenian men, women and children in Bitlis, Mush, and Beyazit. Many of the victims were buried alive in specially prepared ditches. He also crossed into neighboring Persia and massacred Armenians, Assyrians and Persians.

Kut claimed in his memoirs that he personally killed "more or less" 300,000 Armenians. During a meeting at Yerevan in the summer of 1918, he declared to a group of Armenians that he had "endeavored to wipe out the Armenian nation to the last individual."

Early life and military career

Halil graduated from the War Academy (Staff College) in Constantinople in 1905 and received a commission with the rank of Distinguished Captain (Mümtaz Yüzbaşı).

For three years following his graduation he served in the Third Army in Macedonia. When the constitutional order was restored in 1908, the government sent him to Iran to organize dissidence against the Shah whom Persia had installed during the Persian Constitutional Revolution.  After the countercoup of 13 April 1909, he was recalled and became the commander of the Imperial Guard.

Initially he was sent to Salonika to command the mobile gendarmerie units in the region and was involved in fighting insurgents and bandits prior to the Balkan Wars. He also commanded a unit during Balkan Wars. He was among the group of young officers sent to Libya (Trablusgarp) in 1911 to organize the defense against the Italian invasion during the Italo-Turkish War. Before World War I, he served as the commander of a gendarmerie regiment in Van.

World War I

When the Ottoman empire entered World War I, Kut was serving in the Ottoman High Command in Constantinople. He was the military commander of the Istanbul Vilayat between January and December 1914. He later served as a division commander in the Ottoman Third Army on the Russian border, as part of the Caucasus Campaign. 

Later, he was one of the  senior commanders of the Ottoman forces in Mesopotamia, now Iraq, during World War I.

In January 1916, he was given command of the Ottoman forces besieging the British garrison held up in Kut in southern Iraq. After 146 days, on 29 April, British forces surrendered. Four hundred eighty-one officers, including British commander General Charles Townshend, and 13,300 enlisted men were taken prisoner. Credit for this victory is shared with his senior officer and predecessor as commander of the Sixth Ottoman Army, German Field-Marshal Colmar Freiherr von der Goltz, who had died 10 days before.

Halil was promoted to the rank of general following the British surrender. He was appointed governor of the Baghdad province (present day Iraq and Kuwait combined) and was made the commander of the Sixth Army from 19 April 1916 till the end of the war in 1918.

In 1917, Halil Pasha was ordered by War Minister Enver Pasha to move some of his troops to northern Persia. It was an unsuccessful attempt to destabilize the British-supported government there.  This limited his ability to defend Baghdad and led to its capture in 1917. After which fresh British forces were massed at the Iraq front after this surrender.

Role in Armenian genocide
Halil Pasha was responsible for massacring Armenians during the course of the Armenian genocide. He took part in the killings of civilians during the Siege of Van in 1915. He ordered Armenian men in the units under his command be put to death. A Turkish officer in Halil's force testified that "Halil had the entire Armenian population (men, women and children) in the areas of Bitlis, Muş, and Beyazit also massacred without pity. My company received a similar order. Many of the victims were buried alive in especially prepared ditches."

The German vice-consul of Erzurum Max Erwin von Scheubner-Richter reported that "Halil Bey's campaign in northern Persia included the massacre of his Armenian and Syrian battalions and the expulsion of the Armenian, Syrian, and Persian population out of Persia ..." After the defeat of the Ottoman Empire in World War I he was charged for his role in the Armenian genocide before the Turkish Court-Martials. Kut was arrested in January 1919 and later sent to detention in Malta. He managed to evade prosecution and fled from detention to Anatolia in August 1920.

In his memoirs, he would proudly admit to his role in the genocide and his intention to kill every Armenian at every opportunity he could find. Halil justified his actions by accusing the Armenians of being a threat to the Ottoman Empire. He wrote:

Later years

He was jailed by the British Occupying Forces in Constantinople, but escaped and fled to Moscow. In accordance with the terms of the Treaty of Moscow (1921) signed between the Ankara Government and the Soviet leadership, he carried the gold bullion sent by Lenin to Ankara, to pay for Turkey's return of Batumi to the Soviets. Since he was not permitted to stay in Turkey at the time, he first moved back to Moscow and then to Berlin.

He was permitted to return to Turkey after the declaration of the Republic of Turkey in 1923. He died in 1957 in Istanbul. His last wish was to have rakı (an alcoholic drink) poured on his grave, which became a source of controversy among conservatives in Turkey.

See also
Witnesses and testimonies of the Armenian genocide

Sources
 Biographical note - Khalil Pasha - downloaded from FirstWorldWar.com, January 13, 2006.

References

1881 births
1957 deaths
Date of birth unknown
Armenian genocide perpetrators
Ottoman Army generals
Civil servants from the Ottoman Empire
Ottoman Military Academy alumni
Ottoman Military College alumni
Ottoman military personnel of the Balkan Wars
Ottoman military personnel of World War I
Pan-Turkists
Pashas
Military personnel from Istanbul
Turkish nationalists
Enver Pasha
Committee of Union and Progress politicians
Ottoman governors of Baghdad
Sayfo perpetrators